The Nepali Ambassador in Washington, D. C. is the official representative of Nepal to the United States.

List of representatives

References

External links
National Archives and Records Administration

 
Nepal
United States